Criminal Justice and Behavior  is a peer-reviewed academic journal that covers research in the fields of psychology and criminology. The editor-in-chief is Robert D. Morgan (Texas Tech University). It was established in 1974 and is currently published by SAGE Publications in association with the American Association for Correctional and Forensic Psychologists and the International Association for Correctional and Forensic Psychology.

Abstracting and indexing 
Criminal Justice and Behavior  is abstracted and indexed in Scopus and the Social Sciences Citation Index. According to the Journal Citation Reports, its 2017 impact factor is 2.168, ranking it 15 out of 68 journals in the category "Criminology & Penology" and 55 out of 127 journals in the category "Psychology, Clinical".

References

External links 
 
 International Association for Correctional and Forensic Psychology

SAGE Publishing academic journals
English-language journals
Criminology journals
Monthly journals
Publications established in 1973